O'Regan's is a village located north of Port aux Basques. It had a population of 110 by 1956.

See also
 List of communities in Newfoundland and Labrador

Populated coastal places in Canada
Populated places in Newfoundland and Labrador